The Ashanti Goldfields Corporation is a gold mining company based in Ghana that was founded by Joseph Ellis and Joseph Biney both from Cape Coast. The Ashanti Mine, located at Obuasi, 56 km south of Kumasi, has been producing since 1897. During the turn of the century 1900, the Ashanti Goldfields Corporation was among the most important gold mining companies listed at the London Stock Exchange. The mine is sited on one of the world's major gold deposits and is one of the ten largest in the world.

In 1994, the Ghana government, the majority shareholder, announced plans to sell 20-25 percent of its interest in AGC in a share flotation. The  company was listed on the London and Ghana stock exchanges. It was the largest flotation ever organised by any gold mining company coordinating and advisory team alone numbered over 200 people. Each of the company's 10,000 employees received five free shares.

In 1996 AGC was listed on the New York Stock Exchange to raise new capital, it was the first African company to appear on Wall Street.  In 1999, the company succumbed to an ill-executed gold price hedge led by Goldman Sachs, which drove it to the brink of bankruptcy.

In 2004, it merged with AngloGold to create the world's second-largest gold producer, AngloGold Ashanti company. AngloGold is based in South Africa and majority-owned by Anglo American group.

Mines and production
Gold production figures for the company's mines in 2002 and 2003 were (in ounces per annum):

 Percentage figures behind names indicate the share of production of the mine belonging to Ashanti. Production figures shown are those belonging to Ashanti, not overall production.

References

External links
AngloGold Ashanti Homepage
History of Ashanti Goldfields Corporation
 

AngloGold Ashanti
Gold mining companies of Ghana
Defunct mining companies
Defunct companies of Ghana
Economy of Ashanti Region
Non-renewable resource companies established in 1897
Non-renewable resource companies disestablished in 2004
1897 establishments in Africa
2004 disestablishments in Africa
2004 disestablishments in Ghana
British Togoland
Togoland